Türkiye (Turkish for Turkey) is a Turkish newspaper owned by İhlas Group.

The paper was founded by Enver Ören in 1970 as Hakikat, and was renamed Türkiye in 1972. It reached 119,000 circulation in 1985, and 300,000 in 1989. Notable contributors include Rahîm Er.

Türkiye parent company, İhlas Gazetecilik, was floated on the Istanbul Stock Exchange in 2010 (33% of shares, with the remainder owned by İhlas Holding).

References

External links
  
 

Newspapers published in Istanbul
Turkish-language newspapers
Publications established in 1970
1970 establishments in Turkey
Companies listed on the Istanbul Stock Exchange
Daily newspapers published in Turkey